Euura weiffenbachiella is a species of sawfly belonging to the family Tenthredinidae (common sawflies). The larvae forms galls on creeping willows (Salix repens). E. weiffenbachiella is one of a number of closely related species which is known as the Euura atra subgroup.

Description
The shape of the gall is variable, probably depending on where the egg is laid;
 it can develop on one side of the shoot, causing it to bend and look similar to a miniature gall of E. amerinae, or

Found on creeping willow (S. repens) and S. rosmarinifolia.

Other similar looking species in the Euura atra subgroup are,
 E. atra  found on white willow (Salix alba) and crack willow (S. fragilis). 
 E. auritae found on eared willow (S. aurita)
 E. myrtilloides found on swamp willow (Salix myrtilloides)
 E. salicispurpureae found on purple willow (S. purpurea)

Distribution
Liston et al. records the sawfly from central and northern Europe, and east to Yakutia. Redfern et al. records the gall from Great Britain (Scotland) and Ireland.

References

External links
 Euura Gallers

Tenthredinidae
Gall-inducing insects
Hymenoptera of Asia
Hymenoptera of Europe
Insects described in 2017
Willow galls